Abu Muhammad al-Hasan al-Yazuri (or al-Husayn) ibn Ali ibn Abd al-Rahman (died 1058) was a vizier of the Fatimid Caliphate, holding office from 1050 to 1058.

Biography

Al-Yazuri was born in Yazur where he later worked as a judge, before traveling to Ramla. When faced with the governor of Ramla, al-Yazuri fled to Cairo and entered service as a eunuch servant to the princess mother of al-Mustansir Billah called Rasad.

In 1050, relations between the Fatimids and the Zirid dynasty were strained after the Zirids adopted Sunni Islam and subsequently recognized the Abbasid caliph. In 1052, Al-Mu'izz ibn Badis, ruler of the Zirids, put his own name before the name of the caliph in an official letter and came to the Arab tribes Banu Riyah and Banu Zughba who were plundering Egypt and sent requests for alliances to the tribes of Ifriqiya as well as the Banu Sulaym tribe of Cyrenaica.

The Byzantine Empire and Egypt were at peace for some time, and had an agreement to lead each other aid in the event of famine due to lack of wheat in one of the two territories. In 1055, Fatimid exile al-Muayyad fi l-Din Abu Nasr Hibat Allah was able to intercept Byzantine reports that Seljuk sultan Tughril had made a pact with the Greeks against the Fatimids, before coming into contact with the Turkish forces who subsequently promised the help the Fatimid conquest of Baghdad. Shortly after al-Muayyad was sent to Iraq as a Fatimid delegation, and the Fatimid caliph agreed to send troops against Tughril to prevent the conquest of Syria and then Egypt.

In 1058, al-Yazuri was arrested and accused of corresponding with Tughril and supporting Fatimid rivals and enemies of the state. He was taken to Tinnis where he was executed.

References

 
 
 

1058 deaths
11th-century people from the Fatimid Caliphate
Viziers of the Fatimid Caliphate